Mount Hope Cemetery in Rochester, Monroe County, New York, founded in 1838, is the first municipal cemetery in the United States. It is the burial site of Susan B. Anthony and Frederick Douglass. The annual growth rate of this cemetery is 500-600 burials per year.

The cemetery hosts the sculpture Defenders of the Flag, a Civil War monument made in 1908 by the American sculptor Sally James Farnham. In 2018 it was listed on the National Register of Historic Places.

Geology of Mount Hope 
About 12,000 to 14,000 years ago, Mount Hope was covered with ice one to two miles thick. As the glacier receded, cracks appeared in the ice, and these crevasses became rivers of water and gravel. When the miles-high ice sheets finally melted, these river beds were left as ridges created from all the rock and rubble that had been deposited by the flowing river. In geological terms, these ridges are called eskers. One such esker snakes its way through much of Mount Hope Cemetery.

Notable structures and events 

Mount Hope Cemetery was once the site of "The Fandango Tower."  This was a wooden structure, sitting atop the highest elevation of the cemetery, acting as an observation tower.  This offered visitors grand views of the city, as well as the meandering Genesee River.  The Fandango was involved in the "Great Rochester Mirage" of April 1871.  Visitors to the tower noted on the morning of April 16, 1871, that views of the Canadian banks of Lake Ontario could be seen from the tower in great detail, as if replacing those of Rochester.  These views of Canada's lake shores, over 50 miles away, were indeed visible from The Fandango Tower, due to an atmospheric phenomena known as Fata Morgana.  The Fandango Tower is no more, however the ruined foundations can still be found in one of the deep kettles of the cemetery to this day.

The architectural styles of the cemetery's gravestone and grave markers, crypts, chapels, gatehouses, and mausoleums span three centuries.  Distinct motifs of the High Victorian Gothic and Neoclassical architectural traditions persist throughout the cemetery and its various structures. Tiffany glass windows may be found in several of the mausoleums.

The cemetery contains two non-denominational chapels which the Friends group refers to by their construction dates: the 1862 Chapel and the 1912 Chapel. Neither has been used for decades and as of 2020 both are closed to the public due to their structural deterioration.

The cemetery is home to several working water features.  Sylvan Waters, a water feature constructed within a naturally forming kettle pond, was remodeled and brought back into use during the Fall-Winter season of 2016 and 2017.

In June 2000, American Civil War General Elisha Marshall's crypt was desecrated and vandalized, resulting in his remains being scattered throughout the surrounding area.  Marshall's bodily remains were gathered and reinterred, however, the whereabouts of the skull remains a mystery.  The perpetrators were never apprehended or identified.

For years it has been a tradition during elections for people, mostly women, to place "I Voted" stickers on the gravestone of Women's rights activist, Susan B. Anthony. In 2016, 10,000 people were estimated to visit the gravesite during the notable election of having the first woman, Hillary Clinton, running for president on a major party ticket. The headstone was damaged by the residue left by the stickers. As a result, in anticipation of visitors for the 2020 election, Friends of Mount Hope Cemetery placed a clear Plexiglass sleeve to protect the site from further damage.

Notable burials 

 Samuel G. Andrews
 Susan B. Anthony
 Charles S. Baker
 John Jacob Bausch
 Anita Bush
 Hartwell Carver
 Jonathan Child
 Emma Lampert Cooper
 Adelaide Crapsey
 Algernon Crapsey
 Frederick Douglass
 Thomas B. Dunn
 George Ellwanger
 Frank Gannett
 Malcolm Glazer 
 Morton Goldberg
 Seth Green
 James Hard
 Myron Holley
 Rev. Thomas James
 Thomas Kempshall
 Henry Lomb
 General E.G. Marshall
 Vincent Mathews
 Lewis Henry Morgan
 Anna Murray Douglass
 Henry O'Reilly
 Jane Marsh Parker
 Amy and Isaac Post
 Charles Mulford Robinson
 Nathaniel Rochester
 Thomas H. Rochester
 Abraham M. Schermerhorn
 George B. Selden
 Henry R. Selden
 Hiram Sibley
 Elijah F. Smith
 Lucy J. Sprague
 Fletcher Steele
 Margaret Woodbury Strong
 Theron R. Strong
 Samuel R. Thayer
 Lillian Wald
 Henry Augustus Ward
 William Warfield
 Don Alonzo Watson
 Jessica M. Weis
 George Whipple
 Frederick Whittlesey
 Abel Carter Wilder

General Elwell Stephen Otis was originally interred at Mount Hope before being removed to Arlington National Cemetery. Notable cremations at Mount Hope include Blanche Stuart Scott and George Eastman.

Friends of Mount Hope 
The Friends of Mount Hope Cemetery is a non-profit organization of volunteers founded in 1980 to restore, preserve, and encourage public use and enjoyment of this unique historical treasure.

See also

 National Register of Historic Places listings in Rochester, New York
 Votes For Women History Trail

References

Further reading
 Richard O. Reisem (2002). Buried Treasures in Mount Hope Cemetery, Rochester, New York: A Pictorial Field Guide . 
 Richard O. Reisem (2012). Gravestones in Mount Hope Cemetery .

External links 

 Mount Hope Cemetery
 Reforest Mount Hope
 Volunteer At Mount Hope
 The Friends of Mount Hope Cemetery
 Tombstone Inscriptions from Mt. Hope Cemetery

Geography of Rochester, New York
History of Rochester, New York
Cemeteries in Monroe County, New York
Cemeteries on the National Register of Historic Places in New York (state)
National Register of Historic Places in Rochester, New York
Rural cemeteries
Tourist attractions in Rochester, New York
Buildings and structures in Rochester, New York